Scelba may refer to:

 Mario Scelba (1901–1991), Italian Christian Democratic politician who served as the 33rd Prime Minister of Italy 
 Scelba Cabinet, an Italian government, in office from 10 February 1954 until 6 July 1955, for a total of 511 days
 Mercedes Scelba-Shorte,  American fashion model and actress